Pheidole uncagena is a species of ant which was discovered and described by Sarnat, E. M. in 2008.

References

uncagena
Insects described in 2008